Could We Survive is an EP from singer-songwriter/multi-instrumentalist Joseph Arthur. The EP was released in the US on March 18, 2008. Could We Survive is the first in a series of four EPs released in anticipation for the release of Joseph's seventh studio album Temporary People on September 30. From Billboard.com:

The title track "Could We Survive" appeared in the House M.D. episode "Lucky Thirteen", which first aired on October 21, 2008. "Walk Away" also appeared in the Hung episode "Do It, Monkey!" and in the Lie to Me episode "Undercover".

Track listing

Notes
 Recorded and produced by Joseph Arthur, Mathias Schneeberger, Matt Boynton, and Jennifer Turner.
 Musicians: Joseph Arthur, Mathias Schneeberger, Jennifer Turner, and Hoss.
 Photography: Front cover by Joseph Arthur. Inside and back cover by Cerise Leang.
 Lonely Astronaut Records #LA003.

References

Joseph Arthur albums
2008 EPs
Lonely Astronaut Records EPs